Martin Wierstra (29 May 1928 – 23 October 1985) was a professional cyclist from the Netherlands who specialized in motor-paced racing. In this discipline he won three national titles in 1957, 1960 and 1961, as well as a silver medal at the UCI Motor-paced World Championships in 1960.  

After retirement in 1962 he worked as a pharmacy salesman and cycling coach.

References

1928 births
1985 deaths
Dutch male cyclists
Cyclists from Amsterdam